Jake Hill (born 22 February 1994) is a British racing driver who is currently competing in the British Touring Car Championship in 2022 for Rokit MB Motorsport with West Surrey Racing BMW 330e M Sport.  He has also driven for Team HARD, Rob Austin Racing, Motorbase PerformanceTrade Price Cars Racing, MB Motorsport with AmD Tuning, MB Motorsport with Motorbase Performance

Racing career

Ginetta Junior Championship
Hill was born in Tunbridge Wells. After a short karting career, he began car racing in 2008, having signed with Tollbar Racing to tackle the Ginetta Junior Championship Winter Series. Hill finished the series as the top rookie and fourth overall.
This led to Hill joining the main championship in 2009. Despite not racing the full season, Hill took three wins, five Pole Positions, five fastest laps and five podiums and led every race he competed in.

The following season saw the début of the Ginetta G40 in the championship, replacing the previous Ginetta G20. 2010 was just as successful for Hill, which saw him take a further 10 wins, 13 podiums, 8 pole positions and 9 fastest laps on his way to finishing second in the championship to Tom Ingram, after being docked points early in the season.

Ginetta GT Supercup
In 2011, Hill made the step up into a Ginetta G50, racing in the Michelin Ginetta GT Supercup. Hill secured four class wins during this season, and 17 Podiums in 27 races

Hill only had a partial campaign in 2012, but still took a single overall win in the championship and six podiums

Historic Motorsport

Hill achieved a life-time ambition at the 79th Goodwood Members Meeting when he took part in the 'V10 Era' Formula One demo and drove a 1993 Footwork FA14 alongside several other significant 80's & 90's F1 cars.

He previously had partnered Ric Wood in the Gitanes Capri to 4th place (first non-V8 machine( in the Gerry Marshall Trophy that he had taken victory in driving solo at the 78th Members Meeting the previous October.

Hill's Historic Career started when he drove solo in his sponsor Richard Wheeler's John Danby Racing-prepared Lotus Elan 26R in the Pre 66 GT Race at the 2018 Silverstone Classic, Hill fought his way into the lead, and in a remarkable display kept the Shelby Cobras, E-Type Jaguars and TVR Griffiths behind to become the first-ever overall winner in an under 2-Litre machine.

In 2019 Hill shared the same car, now owned by David & Rob Fenn, with Rob Fenn to take wins at Brands Hatch, and Paul Ricard in Masters Historic, then a further win at the Nurburging Old-timer event, the pair also sharing the Fenn's 'Red Rooster' 1966 Ford Mustang to Victory at Brands Hatch in Masters Historic, before a dramatic race at the Silverstone Classic, Hill battling with Craig Davies similar machine, before Davies made contact, spinning Hill out of the lead. Sportingly Davies allowed Hill back past until on the final lap Hill's tyre exploded at 130 mph (as a result of bodywork rubbing after the contract earlier, Hill retaining control, and Davies staying behind giving Hill & Fenn Victory.

Due to Covid restrictions Hill was unable to race regularly in 2020 Historic, but took a spectacular class victory at Goodwood Speedweek in Ric Wood's 1992 Calsonic Nissan Skyline R32 GTR.

During 2021 Hill tested a number of machines for JDR including a 2002 Panoz SR7 LMP900, and raced a Chevron B26 at Donington Park taking class-Pole and Fastest Lap, then a Podium at Brands Hatch in the Lotus 26R with Fenn, before tasking class victory at the Goodwood Festival of Speed in the HKS-Nissan R32 Skyline GTR in the 'Shootout'

Hill & Wood took Pole, Fastest Lap and Victory at Spa-Francorchamps in the Historic Festival the Calsonic Nissan Skyline R32 GTR, Hill also racing Lee Penson's Lotus 26R in the Spa Six Hours Historic.

Finally in 2021 as mentioned previously, Hill raced Ric Wood's 1980 Ford Capri in the Gerry Marshall Trophy at the Goodwood Member's Meeting, taking Pole Position in the wet in his first ever drive in the car, then taking a battling Victory in the final to earn 'Driver of the Day' from AUTOSPORT's expert Marcus Pye.

British Touring Car Championship
2013 saw Hill make his début in the BTCC whilst substituting for absent Addison Lee Motorbase driver Liam Griffin at the Croft round of the championship. Hill took a Jack Sears Trophy class win in the first round of the meeting.

Hill joined Rob Austin Racing prior to the final round of the 2013 season at Brands Hatch, replacing Will Bratt and qualifying 10th, scoring points in all three races and outscoring and out qualifying his race-winning teammate Rob Austin all weekend.

Jake was a BRDC Rising Star from 2010 to 2018, having started racing in 2002 in Cadet Karting, before racing in Ginetta Juniors then rising up to Ginetta GT Supercup. As well as driving for Motorbase Performance, Exocet Racing and AMD Tuning (also competed in British GT with AMD), Won four our of four races in Atom Cup in 2014, and in Porsche Carrera Cup GB scored three podiums in four races, Porsche Mobil 1 Supercup at Silverstone in 2015 and in the BTCC before now finally getting a full season with TeamHard.

In 2016 in Team HARD's Toyota Avensis Hill scored points on 17 occasions, qualified 10th at Donington Park, 11th at Croft and Silverstone, Won the Dunlop #ForeverForward award for most places gained at Oulton Park, finished in the top-ten on 6 occasions, finished 6th overall at Croft having passed Mat Jackson and held Rob Collard at bay for the entire race. Hill finished 5th at Silverstone and in 'Motorsport News' review of the season was voted 6th by the BTCC Team Managers, based on his performances on a limited budget with an older chassis. He also was voted 'HiQ Driver of the Day' at Silverstone by the BTCC fans.

2017 saw Hill stay with Team Hard, now in a VW CC, impressing with 5 top-ten qualifying results with a career-best of 5th at Silverstone, three points scoring finishes at Oulton Park and Snetterton, taking 7 top-ten finishes and posting the fastest time in testing at Snetterton mid-season, and the fastest lap for Independent Drivers at Silverstone.

In 2018 Team HARD expanded to four cars, with Hill now joined by Renault Clio Cup Champion Mike Bushell at Trade Price Cars Brisky Racing racing a heavily revised VW CC, with VW Cup Champion Bobby Thompson and former British GT Champion Michael Caine also running as stablemates. As well as essential support from Trade Price Cars and Brisky Racing and Team HARD, the hugely appreciated support from Rolec, Sportif Cars, Ecoflam, Danfoss, Bill Rawles Classic Cars, AWS Appliance Spares, Scoria Tech, Zynth, Jakob Ebrey Photos, P1 Nutrition, Spine Optics, Octane Hair, Tech Max and many others have made it possible for Hill to compete  and at the opening meeting at Brands Hatch a charging drive in race two saw Hill score his maiden Dunlop BTCC Podium, finishing Second, and taking his and the team's first Independent Category Win, plus fastest lap for Independent Drivers.

2019 started with Hill finishing second in the first race of the year, after gambling with slick tyres on a drying track, mirroring his result from the previous year. On 30 June Hill finished first on the road during the reverse grid race at Oulton Park, but was awarded a 20-second penalty post-race for an incident with Matt Neal on the third lap. After taking points in the first two races at Knockhill, former BTCC champion Alain Menu drew Hill on pole position for race three. Hill made a superb start, managed two safety car re-starts calmly, and despite a scary moment on the final lap, came home to win first BTCC race for AmD Tuning and Trade Price Cars Racing.

For the 2020 season, Hill switched over to MB Motorsport - formed over the winter by AmD Essex joining forces with ex-F1 driver Mark Blundell - to drive a Honda Civic Type R. After a tough start to the year, Hill was able to secure  6 podium finishes through the campaign as he took 20 points scoring finishes in the last 21 races, recovering to finish 7th overall in points despite  five technical failures in the first six races

Into 2021 MB Motorsport joined forces with Motorbase Performance, and Hill on board the new-for-2020 Ford Focus ST With Mountune Power. A superb start to the year saw him score three third place finishes in the opening event at Thruxton - the highlight being a superb drive on slicks on a damp circuit to take the lead, only to lose out late on when the rain fell harder. Hill left Thruxton as the BTCC Championship points leader.

Throughout the season Hill showed strong form - running in the top-5 in points throughout the season, and scoring points in 25 of 30 races, with 20 top-ten results and 9 podium finishes.

Hill took a dominant win in race two at Croft - the largest winning margin of the year - and repeated this a week later in race three at Silverstone, taking the lead mid-race from Dan Lloyd and winning with fastest lap.

Entering the final weekend fourth in points and with a mathematical chance of winning the title, a tough weekend ended well with a battling drive to fourth place - and another fastest lap, ending the his best-ever season 5th in points on 295 - just 11 points from Turkington in second.

Hill's peers voted him 4th overall in the MOTORSPORT NEWS season review - and he was again selected as one of only a dozen Elite young drivers for the British Racing Driver's Club's 'Superstars' programme.

On New Year's Eve 2021 it was announced Hill would join West Surrey Racing as part of MB Motorsport's new venture with Rokit, driving a Hybrid BMW 330e M Sport for the 2022 season.

Racing record

Complete British Touring Car Championship results
(key) (Races in bold indicate pole position – 1 point awarded just in first race) (Races in italics indicate fastest lap – 1 point awarded all races) (* signifies that driver lead race for at least one lap – 1 point given all races)

Complete British GT Championship results
(key) (Races in bold indicate pole position) (Races in italics indicate fastest lap)

References

External links

1994 births
Living people
People from Royal Tunbridge Wells
English racing drivers
British Touring Car Championship drivers
British GT Championship drivers
Porsche Carrera Cup GB drivers
Ginetta GT4 Supercup drivers
Ginetta Junior Championship drivers
BMW M drivers